This is a list of Swedish Counties by GDP and GDP per capita.

List of Counties by GDP 
Counties by GDP in 2015 according to data by the OECD.

List of Counties by GDP per capita
Counties by GDP per capita in 2015 according to data by the OECD.

References 

Gross state product
Counties by GDP
 GDP
Ranked lists of country subdivisions